is a railway station on the Ōu Main Line in the city of Yuzawa, Akita Prefecture,  Japan, operated by JR East.

Lines
Shimo-Yuzawa Station is served by the Ōu Main Line, and is located 214.5 km from the terminus of the line at Fukushima Station.

Station layout
The station consists of two opposed side platforms connected to the station building by a footbridge. The station is unattended.

Platforms

History
Shimo-Yuzawa Station opened on November 28, 1956, as a station on the Japan National Railways (JNR). It has been unattended since December 1979. The station was absorbed into the JR East network upon the privatization of the JNR on April 1, 1987.

Passenger statistics
In fiscal 2007, the last year for which published information is available, the station was used by an average of 50 passengers daily (boarding passengers only).

Surrounding area
 * Site of Iwasaki Castle

See also
List of railway stations in Japan

References

External links

 JR East Station information 

Railway stations in Japan opened in 1905
Railway stations in Akita Prefecture
Ōu Main Line
Yuzawa, Akita